Leticia Pena Spiller (born 19 June 1973) is a Brazilian actress, producer, director, poet, dancer, writer, and singer-songwriter.

Personal life 
Spiller was married to actor Marcello Novaes, with whom she has a son named Pedro, born in 1996.

On January 20, 2011 Spiller gave birth to a girl, Stella, her daughter by her boyfriend, Lucas Loureiro. She was with Loureiro from June 2009 until 2016.

Filmography

Film
 1990 - Lua de Cristal.... Paquita Pituxa Pastel
 1990 - Sonho de Verão.... Paquita Pituxa Pastel
 1991 - Gaúcho Negro.... Adriana
 1997 - O Pulso (short film)
 2000 - Oriundi.... Caterina Padovani / Sofia D'Angelo
 2000 - Villa-Lobos, uma vida de paixão.... Mindinha
 2002 - A Paixão de Jacobina.... Jacobina Mentz
 2002 - Xuxa e os Duendes 2 - No Caminho das Fadas
 2004 - O Problema (short film)
 2007 - Xuxa em Sonho de Menina.... Mother of Kikinha
 2009 - Flordelis - Basta uma Palavra para Mudar.... Volúcia
 2010 - Tudo o que Deus criou.... Maura
 2011 - O Gerente
 2011 - Desenrola.... Virgínia
 2012 - Joãozinho de Carne e Osso (short film)
 2012 - O Inventor de Sonhos

Theater
 Isadora Duncan
 A leve, o próximo nome da Terra
 O falcão e o imperador
 Abelardo e Heloísa
 Peer Gynt

References

External links
 

1973 births
Living people
Actresses from Rio de Janeiro (city)
Brazilian people of German descent
Brazilian people of Portuguese descent
Brazilian people of Spanish descent
Brazilian telenovela actresses
Brazilian film actresses
Brazilian stage actresses
21st-century Brazilian actresses